Landis Township was a township that existed in Cumberland County, New Jersey from 1864 to 1952. It was named after Charles K. Landis, the founder of Vineland.

Landis Township was incorporated as a township by an Act of the New Jersey Legislature on March 7, 1864, from portions of Millville, based on the results of a referendum held on March 22, 1864. Portions of the township were taken to form Vineland Borough (May 28, 1880). Other transfers of territory were made to Maurice River Township (1873), to Franklin Township (Gloucester County) (1892, returned in 1897) and from Millville (1934).

Landis Township lasted until July 1, 1952, when it was combined with Vineland Borough to form Vineland City, based on the results of a referendum held on February 5, 1952.

References

1864 establishments in New Jersey
1952 disestablishments in New Jersey
Former municipalities in Cumberland County, New Jersey
Former townships in New Jersey
Populated places established in 1864
Populated places disestablished in 1952